The Oaks is a neighborhood in Pasadena, California. It is bordered by Mountain Street to the north, Interstate 210 to the south, the El Molino Avenue to the east, and Los Robles Avenue to the west.

Education
The Oaks is home to Madison Elementary School, and is also served by Octavia Butler Middle School, Pasadena High School and John Muir High School.

Transportation
The Oaks is served by Metro Local line 662 and Pasadena Transit route 40.

Government
The Oaks split between City Council District 3, represented by interim councilmember Justin Jones, and District 5, represented by Jessica Rivas.

Neighborhoods in Pasadena, California